James Albert Banks (born 1941) is an American educator and the Kerry and Linda Killinger Endowed Chair in Diversity Studies Emeritus and founding director of the University of Washington's Center for Multicultural Education, which is now the Banks Center for Educational Justice. He focuses on the discipline of multicultural education.

Biography 
Banks grew up on a farm in Arkansas and attended elementary and high school in Lee County, Arkansas.

He received his associate degree with high scholastic honors from Wilson Junior College in Chicago (which is now Kennedy–King College) in 1963). A year later, he received a bachelor's degree in elementary education and social science with honors from Chicago Teachers College, which is now Chicago State University. He received his master’s and Ph.D. degrees in these fields from Michigan State University between 1966 and 1969. He was a faculty member in the College of Education at the University of Washington from 1969 to 2019. He was the Russell F. Stark University Professor at the University of Washington from 2001 to 2006. 

Banks is known for his work in social studies education, multicultural education, and global citizenship education. His work has won numerous scholarly awards including a Spencer Fellowship from the National Academy of Education, the Teaching English to Speakers of Other Languages, Inc. (TESOL) 1998 Presidents' Award, the National Council for the Social Studies 2001 Distinguished Career Research in Social Studies Award, and the inaugural American Educational Research Association (AERA) Social Justice in Education Award for a career of research that advances social justice through education research in 2004. He, with Cherry A. McGee Banks, received the 2018 Lifetime Achievement Award from the National Association for Multicultural Education. 

In 1986, Banks was named a Distinguished Scholar/Researcher on Minority Education by the American Educational Research Association Committee on the Role and Status of Minorities in Educational R & D. He received that Committee's Distinguished Career Award in 1996. In 1994, he was the recipient of the American Educational Research Association Research Review Award. Banks delivered the 29th Annual Faculty Lecture at the University of Washington in 2005, the highest honor given to a professor at that University. He also received in 2005 a Distinguished Alumni Award from Michigan State University. Banks was a Spencer Fellow at the Center for Advanced Study in the Behavioral Sciences at Stanford University during the 2005-2006 academic year. In 2007, he was the Tisch Distinguished Visiting Professor at Teachers College, Columbia University. 

Banks is a past president of the National Council for the Social Studies (NCSS) and the American Educational Research Association (AERA). He is a Fellow of the American Educational Research Association and an elected member of the National Academy of Education and the American Academy of Arts and Sciences.

Banks holds honorary doctorates from the Bank Street College of Education, the University of Alaska, Fairbanks, the University of Wisconsin, Parkside, DePaul University, Lewis and Clark College, and Grinnell College.

Publications 
Banks has written widely in the fields of multicultural education, citizenship education, and social studies education. His works include:

Books authored 
Diversity, Transformative Knowledge, and Civic Education: Selected Essays, 2020
An Introduction to Multicultural Education (6th edition), 2019
Cultural Diversity and Education: Foundations, Curriculum, and Teaching (6th edition), 2016
Teaching Strategies for Ethnic Studies (8th edition), 2009
Educating Citizens in a Multicultural Society (2nd edition), 2007
Race, Culture, and Education: The Selected Works of James A. Banks, 2006

Books edited 
Multicultural Education: Issues and Perspectives (10th edition), co-editor with Cherry A. McGee Banks, 2020
Citizenship Education and Global Migration: Implications for Theory, Research and Teaching, 2017
Global Migration, Diversity, and Civic Education: Improving Policy and Practice, co-editor with Marcelo Suarez-Orozco and Miriam Ben-Perez, 2016
Encyclopedia of Diversity in Education (4 Volumes), 2012
The Routledge International Companion to Multicultural Education, 2009
Diversity and Citizenship Education: Global Perspectives, 2004
Handbook of Research on Multicultural Education (2nd edition), co-editor with Cherry A. McGee Banks, 2004

Books by Banks have been translated into Greek, Japanese, Chinese, Korean, Turkish, and Arabic.

References

James A. Banks Papers, 1966-2019. Papers of a University of Washington professor and specialist in social studies education and multicultural education and Founding Director of the Center for Multicultural Education. University of Washington Libraries, Special collections. http://archiveswest.orbiscascade.org/ark:/80444/xv978972

“Thanks, Professor Banks: ‘The Father of Multicultural Education’ is retiring after 50 at UW. December 2018. University of Washington Magazine. 
https://magazine.washington.edu/feature/james-banks-uw-retires-multicultural-education/

“Family of Fellows: Patricia Banks and James Banks.” Center for Advanced Study in the Behavioral Sciences, Stanford University, March 11, 2019. https://casbs.stanford.edu/news/family-fellows-patricia-banks-and-james-banks

Tomlinson, S. (2021) ‘Book review: Diversity, Transformative Knowledge, and Civic
Education: Selected essays, by James A. Banks’. London Review of Education, 19 (1),
8, 1–3. https://www.scienceopen.com/document_file/aad67498-5c08-4358-b1a3-e4a9745f2790/ScienceOpen/lre19010008.pdf

Powers, T. F. (2002). Postmodernism and James A. Banks’ Multiculturalism: The Limits of Intellectual History. Educational Theory, Vol. 52 (2), 209-221. 

Robert F. Arnove (May, 2019). Review of Citizenship Education and Global Migration: Implications for Theory, Research, and Teaching, edited by James A. Banks. Comparative Education Review, Volume 63, Number 2). https://doi.org/10.1086/702679

External links
Professor James A. Banks, University of Washington, Seattle
Amazon Book List 
Inside the Academy of Education
Columns: Thanks, Professor Banks: ‘The Father of Multicultural Education’ is retiring after 50 years at UW
Article on Banks' New Book of Essays 
University of Washington Faculty Lecture 
Dr. James A. Banks - Founder of Multicultural Education
Western Illinois University Interview
Interview With James and Patricia Banks
Book review: Diversity, Transformative Knowledge, and Civic Education: Selected Essays, by James A. Banks
Review of Citizenship Education and Global Migration: Implications for Theory, Research, and Teaching

1941 births
Living people
University of Washington faculty
Michigan State University alumni
Chicago State University alumni
Kennedy–King College alumni